Jonathan Larmonth Meakins,  (born January 8, 1941) is a Canadian surgeon, academic, and expert in immunobiology and surgical infections.

Life
Born in Toronto, Ontario, he was the son of Jonathan Fayette Meakins, in turn the son of Jonathan Campbell Meakins.
He received a Bachelor of Science degree from McGill University and a Doctor of Medicine from the University of Western Ontario in 1966. He received a Doctor of Science from the University of Cincinnati in 1972.

In 1974, he was appointed an assistant professor of Surgery and microbiology at McGill University. He was appointed an associate professor in 1979 and a professor in 1984.  From 1988 to 1993, he was the chair of the department of surgery. He was surgeon-in-chief at Montreal's Royal Victoria Hospital.

From 2002 to 2008, he was the fourth person and first Canadian appointed to lead the Nuffield Department of Surgery at the University of Oxford as Nuffield Professor of Surgery and fellow of Balliol College, Oxford.

In 1992, he became co-editor of the Canadian Journal of Surgery. He is the author of Surgical Infection in Critical Care Medicine (1985) and Surgical Infections: Diagnosis and Treatment (1994). He is the co-author of Surgical Care of the Elderly (1988), The Care of the Surgical Patient (1988), and Host Defence Dysfunction in Trauma, Shock and Sepsis: Mechanisms and Therapeutic Approaches (1993).

In 2000, he was made an officer of the Order of Canada "as a leader in the development of laparoscopic and transplantation surgery".

References
 

1941 births
Living people
Canadian surgeons
Fellows of Balliol College, Oxford
Academic staff of McGill University
McGill University alumni
Officers of the Order of Canada
People from Toronto
University of Western Ontario alumni
University of Cincinnati alumni